Pascal Bois (born 3 December 1959) is a French politician of La République En Marche! (LREM) who served as a member of the French National Assembly from 2017 to 2022, representing the 3rd constituency of the department of Oise.

Political career
In parliament, Bois served as member of the Committee on Cultural Affairs and Education. In this capacity, he co-authored (together with Constance Le Grip) a 2021 report on the copyright law of France.

In addition to his committee assignments, Bois was a member of the French parliamentary friendship groups with the Dominican Republic, Georgia, India and Jamaica. 

Bois lost his seat in the first round of the 2022 French legislative election.

Political positions
In July 2019, Bois decided not to align with his parliamentary group's majority and became one of 52 LREM members who abstained from a vote on the French ratification of the European Union’s Comprehensive Economic and Trade Agreement (CETA) with Canada.

Controversy
In December 2021, amid the COVID-19 pandemic in France, the garage of Bois’s house in Chambly and his car were set on fire and an adjacent wall scrawled with graffiti by suspected anti-vaccination protesters.

See also
 2017 French legislative election

References

1959 births
Living people
Deputies of the 15th National Assembly of the French Fifth Republic
La République En Marche! politicians
Place of birth missing (living people)